Minuscule 280 (in the Gregory-Aland numbering), ε 294 (Soden), is a Greek minuscule manuscript of the New Testament, on parchment. Paleographically it has been assigned to the 12th century. 
It has marginalia.

Description 

The codex contains the text of the four Gospels on 177 parchment leaves, with lacuna (Mark 8:3-15:36). The text is written in one column per page, in 25-26 lines per page.

There is also another division according to the smaller Ammonian Sections (Matthew 358, Mark 237 – the last section in 16:19, Luke 342, John 226), with references to the Eusebian Canons.

Text 

The Greek text of the codex is a representative of the Byzantine text-type. Aland placed it in Category V.
According to the Claremont Profile Method it represents the textual family Πa in Luke 1, Luke 10, and Luke 20, as a core member.

History 

The manuscript was added to the list of New Testament manuscripts by Scholz (1794-1852).
It was examined and described by Paulin Martin. C. R. Gregory saw the manuscript in 1885.

The manuscript is currently housed at the Bibliothèque nationale de France (Gr. 87) at Paris.

See also 

 List of New Testament minuscules
 Biblical manuscript
 Textual criticism

References

Further reading 

 Jean-Pierre-Paul Martin, Description technique des manuscrits grecs, relatif au Nouveau Testament, conservé dans les bibliothèques des Paris (Paris 1883), p. 68

External links 

 Minuscule 280 at the Encyclopedia of Textual Criticism

Greek New Testament minuscules
12th-century biblical manuscripts
Bibliothèque nationale de France collections